Penn Club may refer to:
Penn Club, London
Penn Club of New York City
The Penn Club of Philadelphia